Dalla superior is a species of butterfly in the family Hesperiidae. It is found in Ecuador and Colombia.

References

Butterflies described in 1923
superior
Hesperiidae of South America
Lepidoptera of Colombia
Lepidoptera of Ecuador